Thomas Gladwin (1710–1799) was an English composer and musician. He was an organist at Vauxhall Gardens, London, England, for some time. Like many English musicians of the time, he seems to have been influenced by Domenico Scarlatti. Some of his harpsichord works have been recorded.

Notes

References
Newton, Richard, "The English Cult of Domenico Scarlatti", Music & Letters, Vol. 20, No. 2 (April 1939), pp. 138–156

External links 
 Vauxhall Gardens Revisited
 Gladwin's Sonata No. 5 in G major

1710 births
1799 deaths
British composers
18th-century composers
18th-century male musicians
18th-century musicians